

The LFG V 101 Jasmund (named for Jasmund on Rügen) was a seaplane airliner produced in small quantities in Germany in the 1920s. It was a conventional, strut-braced, low-wing monoplane with an enclosed cabin for five passengers, an enlarged, metal development of the V 20 Arkona (of which a metal version had already been flown).

The V 101 was produced to operate alongside the V 13s and V 20s in service with Luft-Fahrzeug and Luftverkehr Pommern on seaplane routes in North Germany from 1926, possibly in favour of the V 59 that had been considered for this role.

Specifications

Notes

References
 
 German aviation between 1939-1945

1920s German airliners
Floatplanes
LFG aircraft
Single-engined tractor aircraft
Low-wing aircraft